Andy Fugate (born August 10, 1966) is an American politician who has served in the Oklahoma House of Representatives from the 94th district since 2018.

References

1966 births
Living people
Democratic Party members of the Oklahoma House of Representatives
21st-century American politicians
Asian American and Pacific Islander state legislators in Oklahoma